Endavant–Organització Socialista d'Alliberament Nacional (in Catalan: Forward–Socialist Organisation of National Liberation, Endavant (OSAN); commonly referred to only as Endavant) is an independentist, socialist and feminist Spanish  political party in the Catalan Countries. Endavant was formed in July 2000, as a refoundation of the Platform for the Unity of Action, with the support of independents and local collectives. Endavant supports and is part of the Popular Unity Candidates (CUP).

Ideology and tactics
In addition to claiming the independence of the Catalan Countries, Endavant has prioritised working within the social movements and in the struggles of the Catalan anti-capitalist left like combating job insecurity, participated in the campaign against the European Constitution, following the referendum in February 2005, criticising the project for its neoliberal social aspects and the lack of recognition of the Catalan national rights. Endavant has also been part of the "Network Against Closures and Precariousness", which brings together unions and leftist groups, as well as various initiatives to support workers in struggle against the 2008-2015 Spanish Crisis or in favor of the student mobilisations in defense of public education.

The main demonstrations, in conjunction with the rest of the pro-independence left, that the organisation calls yearly are the one on the National Day of Catalonia, 9 of October, 31 December, 25 April, International Women's Day and International Workers' Day.

History

References

External links
Official website.

2000 establishments in Spain
Catalan independence movement
Catalan nationalist parties
Communist parties in Catalonia
Democratic socialist parties in Europe
Eurosceptic parties in Spain
Feminist organisations in Spain
Feminist parties in Europe
Left-wing nationalist parties
Political parties established in 2000
Political parties in Catalonia
Socialist feminist organizations
Socialist parties in Catalonia